Duke of Windsor was a title in the Peerage of the United Kingdom. It was created on 8 March 1937 for the former monarch Edward VIII, following his abdication on 11 December 1936. The dukedom takes its name from the town where Windsor Castle, a residence of English monarchs since the time of Henry I, following the Norman Conquest, is situated. Windsor has been the house name of the royal family since 1917.

History
King Edward VIII abdicated on 11 December 1936, so that he could marry the American divorcée Wallis Simpson. At the time of the abdication, there was controversy as to how the former King should be titled. The new King George VI apparently brought up the idea of a title just after the abdication instrument was signed, and suggested using "the family name". Neither the Instrument of Abdication signed by Edward VIII on 10 December 1936 nor its enabling legislation, His Majesty's Declaration of Abdication Act 1936, indicated whether the king was renouncing the privileges of royal birth as well as relinquishing the throne. On 12 December 1936, at the Accession Council of the Privy Council of the United Kingdom, George VI announced he was to make his brother the "Duke of Windsor" with the style of Royal Highness. That declaration is recorded in the London Gazette. The Dukedom was formalised by Letters Patent on 8 March 1937. Edward, as a royal duke, could neither stand for election to the House of Commons nor speak on political subjects in the House of Lords. On 3 June 1937, Edward married Wallis Simpson, who upon their marriage became the Duchess of Windsor. Following his abdication, Edward and Wallis lived in exile in Paris, France, except while he was Governor of the Bahamas. When Germany invaded France in May 1940, the duke and duchess moved to Spain and then Portugal until August when they set sail for the Bahamas. After the war, they became members of cafe society often splitting their time between Paris and the United States, which they visited frequently. During their stays in New York, they were fond of the Waldorf Astoria Hotel. The Duke suffered from ill health in his later years and died of cancer on 28 May 1972 in Paris. As the Duke died without issue, the title became extinct upon his death. It is considered "somewhat sullied" by Edward's reputation, making a recreation unlikely.

| Prince EdwardHouse of Windsor1937–1972
| 
| 23 June 1894White Lodge, Richmondson of King George V and Queen Mary
| Wallis Simpson3 June 1937
| 28 May 1972Villa Windsor, Parisaged 77
|-
|}

Royal arms
As the royal arms go hand-in-hand with the crown, the undifferentiated royal arms passed to George VI. It was and is common heraldic practice for the eldest son to differentiate his arms in his father's lifetime, but the Duke of Windsor was left in the unusual position of the eldest son needing to difference his arms after his father's death. This was done by means of a label argent of three points, bearing on the middle point an imperial crown proper.

See also
 Baron Windsor
 Viscount Windsor
 Earl of Windsor

References

Extinct dukedoms in the Peerage of the United Kingdom
Duke of Windsor
Edward VIII
Abdication of Edward VIII
Duke of Windsor
Duke of Windsor